Honey comes in various types based on the region it is grown and the types of flower that provide the nectar.

Europe
There are several European honey types with PDO/PGI that are protected under EU law with PDO status. Some of the criteria for the production of this honey include that it:
must be of high quality
may not contain any imported honey
may not contain any additives
must have a water content of less than 20%
Bulgaria
 Strandzhanski manov med

Greece
 Menalou vanilia fir honey – "Vanilla" honey of Mount Mainalo, Arcadia that is made from fir blossom nectar.

Spain
 Miel de Galicia or Mel de Galicia
 Miel de Granada
 Miel de La Alcarria

France
 Miel d'Alsace
 Miel de Corse
 Miel de Provence
 Miel de Sapin des Vosges

Italy
 Miele della Lunigiana
 Miele delle Dolomiti bellunesi

Luxembourg
 Miel luxembourgeois de marque nationale

Malta
 Ghasel

Poland
 Miód wrzosowy z Borów Dolnośląskich (heather honey from the Lower Silesian Forest)
 Bartnik Sądecki
 APIS Apiculture Cooperative

Portugal
 Mel da Serra da Lousã
 Mel da Serra de Monchique
 Mel da Terra Quente
 Mel das Terras Altas do Minho
 Mel de Barroso
 Mel do Alentejo
 Mel do Parque de Montezinho
 Mel do Ribatejo Norte
 Mel dos Açores

Ukraine
 Sunflower
 Buckwheat
 Acacia

Australia and Pacific Islands

 Eucalyptus honey made in Australia
 Leatherwood Honey, a noted monofloral honey from Tasmania that has been recognised by the international Slow Food movement in its Ark of Taste. 
 Manuka honey made in New Zealand

Africa
South Africa
 Fynbos honey

America
American honeys include:
Chile
 Miel de Ulmo ("ulmo honey") with nectar from Eucryphia cordifolia.

Asia
Cambodia
 Mondulkiri wild honey

References

European Union laws
Honey
Products with protected designation of origin